Bradley Klahn became the first champion of the event defeating Taro Daniel in the final.

Seeds

Draw

Finals

Top half

Bottom half

References
 Main Draw
 Qualifying Draw

Yeongwol Challenger Tennis - Singles
2013 Singles